Five Points is an unincorporated community in Madison County, Tennessee, United States.

Notes

Unincorporated communities in Madison County, Tennessee
Unincorporated communities in Tennessee